Texas United is an American soccer club that currently competes in USL League Two, the fourth tier of the American Soccer Pyramid. The club plays its home games at the University of Texas at Dallas.

In March 2017, it was announced that the club had been granted a franchise license for USL League 2, to operate in the Dallas–Fort Worth metroplex area.

The team is owned by Neltex Sports Group who are also owners of the Texas Airhogs and co-owners of the NBA G League franchise the Texas Legends.

History

2017 season
The club was founded in March 2017 and announced Ryan Higginbotham as the club's inaugural head coach. The Texans finished the season with a respectful 5-8-1.

Arez Ardalani Era (2018-2022)
In January 2018 Neltex Sports Group hired Arez Ardalani as the new head coach of Texas United. Signings of new players saw plenty of FC Dallas college based players added to the roster. The Texans started the season very strong with a 5-0 victory against FC Cleburne at home and a 3-2 victory against OKC Energy U23 away. After multiple away games and a tough schedule the Texans were able to set the franchise record at 5-6-3, with multiple team and individual honors. As a result of the successful season many players were invited to or signed professional contracts with USL organizations such as Pittsburgh Riverhounds SC and North Texas SC.

Texas United started its 2019 season with early spring exhibitions against USL Championship clubs such as El Paso Locomotive FC, OKC Energy, and Swope Park Rangers. After the spring season Texas United moved forward with signing multiple trialist that impressed during the exhibition matches. The club had its 2019 season opener against Houston Dynamo USL 2 franchise Brazos Valley Cavalry FC.

Spring season play began in January with Texas United playing El Paso Locomotive FC. Before the beginning of the 2020 USL Championship season the squad went down to play the Austin Bold FC. The USL League 2 season was cancelled due to COVID-19.

2021 was a historic season for Texas United. The team made playoffs for the first time in club history and posted a franchise record of 6-5-3.

Texas United won their first trophy in 2022 by clinching the USL2 MidSouth Division championship in historic fashion. The club went undefeated with a 9-0-5 record, the only non-MLS club to do so in the divisions 20 year history. Texas United finished the season ranked 12th out of 113 clubs in the regular seasons final power rankings. Arez Ardalani left the club after the season, ending his era which took the Texas United project from a low tier USL 2 club to a top 15 tier 1 club.

Players and staff

Current roster

Notable players
This list of notable players comprises players who have gone on to play professional soccer after playing for the team in the Premier Development League, or those who previously played professionally before joining the team.

  Nicky Hernandez
  Cesar Murillo
  Caleb Smith
  Pato Botello Faz
  Matt Constant
  Giovanni Montesdeoca
  Papa Ndoye
  Ben Hale

Team management 

 Last updated: 9 August 2018 
 Source:

Record

Year–by–year

Head coaches
 Includes USL 2 Regular season

Honors

USL League Two
 Division Champions (1)
 MidSouth Division Champions: 2022

 USL League Two Playoffs (2)
 2021, 2022

Stadium

 AirHogs Stadium (2017–2020), capacity 5,500

The club played in AirHogs Stadium, a baseball park that was also the home field for the Texas AirHogs of the American Association of Independent Professional Baseball. The venue featured a 17,000 square-foot Wide World of Parks Kids Zone, restaurant/sports bar, cigar bar and swimming pool. It seated 5,500 and offered 13 luxury suites.

The facility had housed a number of minor league franchises, college sporting events and concerts such as the Dallas Desire, NJCAA College Baseball, High school Baseball, WAC Baseball Tournament and the NCAA Division II Baseball World Series in 2017.

 University of Texas at Dallas (2021)

With AirHogs Stadium being bought for conversion to a cricket-specific stadium, the club's home games were played primarily at the University of Texas at Dallas beginning in the 2021 season, though their schedule also showed home dates at two public schools: Arlington Heights High School and Gateway Field at Gateway Charter Academy.

References

External links
 
 Texas United | uslleaguetwo.com at United Soccer League

USL League Two teams
Soccer clubs in Texas
Sports in Grand Prairie, Texas
2017 establishments in Texas
Association football clubs established in 2017